Loma is a village in the Jandaha block of Vaishali district in the Indian state of Bihar. It is located more than 30 km from the nearest city of Hajipur.

Demographics
As per the 2011 census, Loma has a total population of 8,124 people, with 1,696 households.

Administration
Loma is a Gram panchayat consisting of two villages, namely Loma and Rahua. The Loma gram panchayat falls under the administrative region of Jandaha Block. 
There are 16 wards in the Loma gram panchayat.

Education
Loma has one pre-primary school, five primary schools, and three middle schools.

Transportation

 Loma is 30 km from Hajipur Junction, which is also the zonal office of the East Central Railway. Public transport is easily available from Hajipur to Loma village.
 Samstipur Railway Station is 25 km from the village; public transport or private cabs are easily available from Samstipur to Loma.
 The village is 50 km from Patna Junction railway station.

References

Villages in Vaishali district